The Pennsylvania State Game Lands Number 24 are Pennsylvania State Game Lands in Clarion, and Forest Counties in Pennsylvania in the United States providing hunting, bird watching, and other activities.

Geography
State Game Lands Number 24 is located in Farmington Township in Clarion County, and in Green and Jenks Townships in Forest County. Nearby populated places include Crown, Frills Corner, Gilfoyle, Golinza, Guitonville, Leeper, Lickingville, Muzette, Newmansville, North Pine Grove, Tylersburg, Vowinckel, Williams and Wolfs Corner.

The Knox and Kane Railroad roughly follows Route 66 also passing close to the southeast.

Named streams in SGL 24 include Big Weaver Run, Bull Run, Coon Creek, Dans Run, Ellsworth Run, Fox Run, Irish Run, Judy Run, Little Coon Creek, Little Coon Run, Little Weaver Run, Walley Run, Wolf Run, and Zipp Run, which all are part of the Allegheny River watershed.

Nearby recreational and protected areas include:

Federal
Allegheny National Forest

State
Chapman State Park
Clear Creek State Park
Cook Forest State Park
Oil Creek State Park

Pennsylvania State Game Lands
Pennsylvania State Game Lands Number 25
Pennsylvania State Game Lands Number 28
Pennsylvania State Game Lands Number 29
Pennsylvania State Game Lands Number 31
Pennsylvania State Game Lands Number 44
Pennsylvania State Game Lands Number 45
Pennsylvania State Game Lands Number 54
Pennsylvania State Game Lands Number 72
Pennsylvania State Game Lands Number 74
Pennsylvania State Game Lands Number 86
Pennsylvania State Game Lands Number 96
Pennsylvania State Game Lands Number 143
Pennsylvania State Game Lands Number 244
Pennsylvania State Game Lands Number 266
Pennsylvania State Game Lands Number 272
Pennsylvania State Game Lands Number 283
Pennsylvania State Game Lands Number 309

Statistics

Biology
SGL 24 is roughly 94% terrestrial forested with a small percentage of wetland. Game species include bear (Ursus americanus), deer (Odocoileus virginianus), ruffed grouse (Bonasa umbellus), gray squirrel, (Sciurus carolinensis), turkey (Meleagris gallopavo). Non-game species include Northern Goshawk (Accipiter gentilis), Blackburnian warbler (Setophaga fusca), Black-throated blue warbler (Setophaga caerulescens) and Magnolia warbler (Setophaga magnolia).

See also
Pennsylvania State Game Lands

References

External links
The National Map Advance Viewer
Geographic Names Information System
State Game Lands 024

024
Protected areas of Clarion County, Pennsylvania
Protected areas of Forest County, Pennsylvania